Gildersleeve's Bad Day is a 1943 American comedy film directed by Gordon Douglas from a screenplay by Jack Townley. The picture was the second in the Gildersleeve's series produced and distributed by RKO Radio Pictures, based on the popular NBC radio program, The Great Gildersleeve, created by Leonard L. Levinson, and was released on June 10, 1943.  The film stars Harold Peary, Jane Darwell and Nancy Gates.

Plot
When Throckmorton P. Gildersleeve is selected to serve on a jury, he is thrilled at the prospect of being able to serve his fellow citizens. The trial is of Louie, a local gangster, who has been charged with burglary. Louie's henchman fear that their boss faces conviction, so they decide to pick one of the jurors to influence the vote for acquittal. They pick Gildersleeve, and send him an anonymous note offering him $1000 ($ today). The note arrives the morning Gildersleeve is due at court, and he shoves it into the pocket of a suit without looking at it. After he leaves for the court, his niece, Margie Forrester, sends the suit to the cleaners.

At the cleaners the owner of the store, George Peabody, finds the note and reads it. He returns the note to Margie, not letting her know that he has read it, but intimating that he knows its contents. After the trial, Gildersleeve is the lone holdout for acquittal. Hearing that the jury cannot reach a verdict, Margie is afraid that her uncle has agreed to the bribe. She attempts to see him at the courthouse, but failing that she maneuvers the judge into allowing the jury to retire to their house for the night, since they are sequestered and need a place to stay.

Peabody blackmails Margie into going to a dance with him that night, standing up her boyfriend Jimmy, and  threatens to disclose the contents of the note if she doesn't. While at the dance, Gildersleeve convinces his fellow jurors to acquit. The next day, believing that Gildersleeve has voted for acquittal because of the bribe, Louie has his henchmen pay the $1000, which he steals from the judge's safe. Gildersleeve believes the money is a donation for the USO club of which he is chairman. He takes the money to the judge's house to put in his safe. When he is shown Louie's note, he realizes the true nature of the funds and attempts to steal them back from the judge's safe. During the attempt he is taken prisoner by Louie and his henchmen, using a police car they have stolen. They intend to take him to the country and kill him. As they drive, Gildersleeve unobtrusively turns on the police radio, broadcasting the car's conversation. As the gangsters discuss what happened, they provide enough evidence to clear Gildersleeve of any wrongdoing. Once that happens, Gildersleeve forces the car off the road, crashing it. The thieves are captured and Gildersleeve is exonerated.

Cast list
 Harold Peary as Throckmorton P. Gildersleeve
 Jane Darwell as Aunt Emma
 Nancy Gates as Margie Forrester
 Charles Arnt as Judge Horace Hooker
 Freddie Mercer as Leroy Forrester
 Russell Wade as Jimmy
 Lillian Randolph as Birdie
 Frank Jenks as Al
 Douglas Fowley as Louie
 Alan Carney as Toad
 Grant Withers as Henry Potter
 Richard LeGrand as J. W. Peavy
 Dink Trout as Otis
 Harold Landon as George Peabody
 Charles Cane as Police Chief
 Ken Christy as Bailiff
 Joey Ray as Tom
 Joan Barclay as Julie Potter

(cast list as per AFI database)

Production
In January 1943 it was announced that Gordon Douglas had been attached to the project as director. Production on the picture began in February 1943. By the middle of March filming had concluded. The film was finished in May and was previewed at trade shows between May 3–6. The film marked the screen debut of Barbara Hale, who played a small—and uncredited—role as one of the girls at a party attended by Gildersleeve. Also making his big-screen debut was Richard LeGrand, who was more well known for his work on radio, playing the role of J. W. Peavy, which he originated on the Gildersleeve radio program.

Reception
The Film Daily gave the film a lukewarm review, opining that the picture would appeal to fans of the radio program on which it was based, while others would find it contrived and unbelievable. They were not kind to Peary in the title role, but did compliment the acting of the rest of the cast. Motion Picture Daily was even less kind, calling the story "poorly-crafted". They went on to say that the only portion of the viewing public which would enjoy the picture would be that segment which enjoyed his radio show. They felt that the weak plot offset Peary's effectiveness as Gildersleeve.

References

External links
 
 
 
 

1943 films
American comedy films
Films based on radio series
Films directed by Gordon Douglas
RKO Pictures films
American black-and-white films
1943 comedy films
1940s American films
The Great Gildersleeve